Ty Hunter Allert (born July 23, 1963) is a former American football player. He graduated from Northbrook High School in Houston, Texas in 1982. He played linebacker for the San Diego Chargers, the Philadelphia Eagles, the Denver Broncos, and the Seattle Seahawks. The ,  Allert is a former Texas Longhorns player (1982–85). He recorded 10½ quarterback sacks during the 1985 season. In 1991, Allert became a volunteer assistant for coach David McWilliams at Texas.

References

1963 births
Living people
Players of American football from Houston
American football linebackers
Texas Longhorns football players
San Diego Chargers players
Philadelphia Eagles players
Denver Broncos players
Seattle Seahawks players